Chùa Hang is a ward of Thái Nguyên city in Thái Nguyên Province, Vietnam. Previously, the ward was the townlet and is the capital of Đồng Hỷ district until the end of 2017.

References

Populated places in Thái Nguyên province